Maureen Javier Franco Alonso (born 13 December 1983), known as Maureen Franco, is a Uruguayan footballer who currently plays as a striker for CA Fénix.

Career
Born in Durazno, Franco began playing club football with Nacional. After failing to break into the first team, Franco went on loan to Uruguayan Segunda División side Club Sportivo Cerrito. A season later, he joined Cerrito on a permanent basis and helped the club gain promotion to the first division. After scoring 13 goals in 14 matches to lead the 2009 Torneo Apertura, Franco earned a move to Argentine Primera División side Chacarita Juniors in January 2010.

In 2016, Franco joined Primera Division side C.A. Cerro. The following season, he scored 25 goals for the club (the second most in the league).

Notes

References

External links
 
 

1983 births
Living people
People from Durazno
Uruguayan footballers
Uruguayan expatriate footballers
Uruguayan Primera División players
China League One players
Argentine Primera División players
Torneo Federal A players
Club Nacional de Football players
Sportivo Cerrito players
Montevideo Wanderers F.C. players
Tacuarembó F.C. players
Chacarita Juniors footballers
Racing de Olavarría footballers
C.D. Técnico Universitario footballers
Liverpool F.C. (Montevideo) players
Club Atlético River Plate (Montevideo) players
Rampla Juniors players
Sud América players
C.A. Cerro players
Centro Atlético Fénix players
Association football forwards
Expatriate footballers in Argentina
Expatriate footballers in China
Uruguayan expatriate sportspeople in Argentina
Uruguayan expatriate sportspeople in China